The 2002–03 All-Ireland Junior Club Football Championship was the second staging of the All-Ireland Junior Club Football Championship since its establishment by the Gaelic Athletic Association.

The All-Ireland final was played on 10 May 2003 at Shamrock Park in Cremartin, between Nobber and Kilmeena. Nobber won the match by 2-13 to 1-13 to claim their first ever championship title.

All-Ireland Junior Club Football Championship

All-Ireland final

References

2002 in Irish sport
2003 in Irish sport
All-Ireland Junior Club Football Championship
All-Ireland Junior Club Football Championship